The 2010–11 UEFA Women's Champions League was the tenth edition of the European women's championship for football clubs. The final was held in London, England on 26 May 2011 at Craven Cottage.

French side Olympique Lyon won the competition after finishing runner-up the previous year. Lyon became the first French team to win the competition.

Team allocation and distribution
On 14 June 2010 UEFA announced the entry list. A total of 51 teams from 43 UEFA associations will participate. This is two less than in 2009–10, as the title holder Turbine Potsdam also qualified through its domestic league, and the winners of the Maltese league were not entered. Countries are allocated places according to their 2009 UEFA league coefficient for women, taking into account performances in women's club competitions between 2004–05 and 2008–09.

Associations 1–8 have two club qualify, the remaining associations have one team. Unlike the men's Champions League, not every association enters a team, and so the exact number of clubs in each round is only known shortly before the draw.

Teams

Qualifying round

Seeding and draw

The draw was held on 23 June 2010. 28 teams enter in the qualifying round, and were divided into seven groups of four teams, with one team from each seeding pot:

Pot 1
  Umeå
  Duisburg
  Brøndby (host)
  Rossiyanka
  Bardolino
  Everton
  Juvisy

Pot 2
  Breiðablik (host)
  SFK 2000 Sarajevo
  1º Dezembro
  NSA Sofia
  Glasgow City
  Gintra Universitetas (host)
  Krka (host)

Pot 3
  FCM Târgu Mureş
  KÍ Klaksvík
  Osijek (host)
  ASA Tel Aviv University
  FC Roma Calfa
  Slovan Bratislava
  Swansea City

Pot 4
  St Francis
  Apollon Limassol (host)
  Levadia Tallinn
  Crusaders Newtownabbey Strikers (host)
  Borec Veles
  Gazi Üniversitesi
  FC Baia Zugdidi

The seven hosts were confirmed by UEFA before the draw, and two hosts could not be placed in the same group. Brøndby, Gintra Universitetas, Krka, Osijek and Apollon Limassol also hosted tournaments last year. The other two hosts from last year (Linköping and Tikvesanka) did not enter the qualifying round this year.

Each team plays the other teams in the group once. The matches were played between 5 and 10 August 2010. Teams in italic hosted a mini-league.

Tie-breaker criteria

As usual in UEFA competitions, three points are awarded for a win, and one point for a draw. If teams are equal on points after all matches have been played, the following criteria applies:

 Higher number of points obtained in the matches among the teams in question.
 Superior goal difference resulting from the matches among the teams in question.
 Higher number of goals scored in the matches among the teams in question.
 Superior goal difference in all group matches
 Higher number of goals scored in all group matches
 Higher number of club coefficient points
 Drawing of lots

Criteria 1–3 are reapplied until the tie cannot be resolved; only then is criteria 4 used.

Group 1

Matches were played at Brøndby IF's bane 2 and Brøndby Stadium.

Group 2

Matches were played at Savivaldybė Stadium, Šiauliai and City Stadium, Pakruojis.

Group 3

Matches were played at Neo GSZ Stadium, Larnaca and Tsirion Stadium, Limassol.

Group 4

Matches were played at Kópavogsvöllur, Kópavogur and Vikin, Reykjavík.

Group 5

Matches were played at Matija Gubec Stadium, Krško and Ivančna Gorica Stadium, Ivančna Gorica.

 Krka vs Baia Zugdidi was abandoned due to bad pitch conditions. The match was replayed on 8 August 2010.

Group 6

Matches were played at Gradski vrt, Osijek and Stadion HNK Cibalia, Vinkovci.

Group 7

Matches were played at the Showgrounds, Ballymena; Stangmore Park, Dungannon and Mill Meadow, Castledawson.

Ranking of group runners-up

The two best runners-up also qualify for the round of 32. The match against the fourth-placed team in the group does not count for the purposes of the runners-up table. The tie-breakers in this ranking are:

 Higher number of points obtained
 Superior goal difference
 Higher number of goals scored
 Higher number of club coefficient points
 Fair play conduct in all group matches

Knockout phase

The draw for the round of 32 and round of 16 was held on 19 August 2010. The draw for the quarter-finals and onwards was made on 19 November 2010. The bracket has been created in retrospect.

Bracket

Round of 32 

16 teams are seeded in this round, and play the second leg at home. Teams from the same association may not play each other. The first leg is scheduled for the week of 22 September 2010, the second leg for the week of 13 October 2010. The draw was made on 19 August 2010.

First Leg

Round of 16 

The draws for this and all subsequent rounds are not seeded, and clubs from the same association may play each other. This round is scheduled for the week of 3 November and the week of 10 November 2010.

Quarter-finals 
The quarter final first ties were played on March 16 and 17, the second ties on March 23.

First Leg

Second Leg 

Lyon won 1–0 on aggregate.

3–3 on aggregate. Arsenal won on away goals

Duisburg won 5–2 on aggregate.

Potsdam won 9–2 on aggregate.

Semi-finals

First Leg

Second Leg

Final

Top goalscorers
The top goal scorers with the qualifying round excluded are:

Round and draw dates

UEFA has scheduled the competition as follows.

References

External links
UEFA Site

 
Women's
UEFA Women's Champions League seasons
UEFA
UEFA